The following is a list of football stadiums in Hungary, ordered by capacity. Currently stadiums with a capacity of 1,000 or more are included. In italics - currently under construction or reconstruction

Current stadiums

Bold: Teams in Nemzeti Bajnokság I (NB I).

Over 15,000 capacity

Under 15,000 capacity

Historical stadiums
The following is a list of demolished stadia.

See also
List of European stadiums by capacity
List of association football stadiums by capacity

References

External links
 List of UEFA Elite Stadiums
 Hungarian Football Database
List of Stadiums Pictures in Hungary

 
Hungary
Football stadiums